Juan Gisbert Sr. and Manuel Orantes were the defending champions, but did not participate this year.

František Pala and Balázs Taróczy won the title, defeating Nikola Špear and John Whitlinger 6–3, 6–4 in the final.

Seeds

  Jürgen Fassbender /  Karl Meiler (first round)
  Bob Carmichael /  Dick Crealy (first round)

Draw

Draw

External links
 Draw

1977 Grand Prix (tennis)
1977 BMW Open